Live in a Dive is a live album by Californian punk rock band Swingin' Utters. Released in 2004, it is the sixth in the Live in a Dive series.

 The album features songs from all the band's albums, and many of their E.P.s, up to the album Dead Flowers, Bottles, Bluegrass, and Bones, which was released a month before Live in a Dive was recorded. The set is notable for its length (over one hour), the band's use of "acoustical instruments" including accordion on several songs, and Spike Slawson's bizarre story of an encounter with a drunk naked trucker in a Portage, Indiana motel while on tour.
 The cover booklet also features a comic strip story by Joel Loya, involving the Swingin' Utters meeting the ghosts of Joe Strummer, Joey Ramone, Darby Crash and Sid Vicious.

Personnel
 Johnny Bonnel (vocals)
 Darius Koski (guitar, vocals, accordion)
 Greg McEntee (drums)
 Spike Slawson (bass, vocals)
 Chuck Worthy (guitar)

Track listing
The vinyl edition of this album was a double LP, containing two songs not featured on the 23-track CD version.All songs by Swingin' Utters unless stated.

Side A:
 "Don't Ask Why" – 2:26
 "Pills & Smoke" – 2:42
 "Five Lessons Learned" – 1:54
 "Jackie Jab" – 2:10
 "Nowhere Fast" – 2:01
 "Glad" – 2:10
 "Tied Down, Spit On" – 1:18
 "Hopeless Vows" – 2:17
Side B:
 "Fruitless Fortunes" – 3:54
 "All That I Can Give" – 2:42
 "Windspitting Punk" – 2:15
 "Tell Me Lies" (vinyl only)
 "The Courage of a Younger Pope" – 2:46
 "Sign in a Window" (vinyl only)
Side C:
 "No Eager Men" – 3:07
 "15th and T" – 2:02
 "Teenage Genocide" – 2:05
 "I Got Your Number" (Beaufoy, Bruce, Burgess, McFaull) – 2:33
 "Mother of the Mad" – 2:20
 "London Drunk" – 3:32
Side D:
 "Expletive Deleted" – 4:13
 "The Next in Line" – 3:46
 "The Dirty Sea" – 3:06
 "Here We Are Nowhere" (Cluney)   – 0:56
 "Catastrophe" – 6:59

Swingin' Utters albums
Fat Wreck Chords Live in a Dive series
2004 live albums
Albums produced by Ryan Greene